Daviesia pseudaphylla, commonly known as Stirling Range daviesia, is a species of flowering plant in the family Fabaceae and is endemic to the Stirling Range in the south-west of Western Australia. It is an open, spreading, glabrous shrub with low-lying stems, scattered, cylindrical phyllodes indistinguishable from branchlets, and orange-yellow and dark reddish flowers.

Description

Taxonomy
Daviesia pseudaphylla was first formally described in 1995 by Michael Crisp in Australian Systematic Botany from specimens collected in the Stirling Range by Kenneth Newbey in 1978. The specific epithet (pseudaphylla) means "false-leafless", referring to the species' appearing to lack phyllodes.

Distribution and habitat
Stirling Range daviesia is only known from two small populations in the Stirling Range where it grows on gentle slopes in open mallee and heath near the foot of the range.

Conservation status 
Daviesia pseudaphylla is declared an "endangered" species under the Australian Government Environment Protection and Biodiversity Conservation Act 1999, and as "threatened" by the Western Australian Government Department of Biodiversity, Conservation and Attractions, meaning that it is in danger of extinction. The main threat to the species is inappropriate fire regimes, and a potential threat is from dieback due to Phytophthora cinnamomi.

References 

pseudaphylla
Taxa named by Michael Crisp
Plants described in 1995
Flora of Western Australia